A.I.Bheemavaram is a village in West Godavari district in the state of Andhra Pradesh in India.

Demographics

 India census, A.I.Bheemavaram has a population of 4554 of which 2253 are males while 2301 are females. The average sex ratio of A.I.Bheemavaram village is 1021. The child population is 381, which makes up 8.37% of the total population of the village, with sex ratio 1071. In 2011, the literacy rate of A.I.Bheemavaram village was 65.71% when compared to 67.02% of Andhra Pradesh.

See also 
 West Godavari district

References 

Villages in West Godavari district